Claudio Leonardo Rodríguez (born 3 February 1969) is an Argentine football coach and former player who played as either a midfielder or a forward. He is the current manager of Bolivian club Real Santa Cruz, with Miguel Abrigo.

Playing career
Born in Santiago del Estero, Rodríguez began his career with hometown side Mitre (SdE) before joining the youth setup of Boca Juniors. He made his senior debut with the side in November 1989, but lost space after the arrival of Óscar Tabárez as manager.

Rodríguez spent the 1992 season at Chilean side Universidad de Chile, before returning to Boca in the following year. He subsequently represented Alvarado, San Martín de Tucumán, Atlético Tucumán, Nueva Chicago, Douglas Haig and Atlanta in his home country, before moving abroad in 2000 with San José.

Rodríguez remained in Bolivia in the following years, playing for Oriente Petrolero and Guabirá.

Managerial career
Rodríguez was an assistant of José Peña at Real Santa Cruz in 2012, 2013 and 2018. He later worked as a youth and assistant manager at Royal Pari,

Rodríguez returned to Real Santa Cruz in 2021, being in charge of the youth categories. On 3 January 2023, he was named manager of the first team, along with compatriot Miguel Abrigo.

Personal life
In February 2003, Rodríguez was arrested with another man after being accused of drug trafficking. Sentenced of four years and five months of jail in December 2004, he was released after 27 months imprisoned in March 2006, being absolved of his charges.

Rodríguez is nicknamed Rata (mouse). He was initially called Rattín by his uncle (after Antonio Rattín), being shortened to Rata when he arrived in Buenos Aires.

References

External links

1969 births
Living people
People from Santiago del Estero
Argentine footballers
Association football midfielders
Association football forwards
Argentine Primera División players
Boca Juniors footballers
Universidad de Chile footballers
Club Atlético Alvarado players
San Martín de Tucumán footballers
Atlético Tucumán footballers
Nueva Chicago footballers
Club Atlético Douglas Haig players
Club Atlético Atlanta footballers
Club San José players
Oriente Petrolero players
Club Deportivo Guabirá footballers
Argentine expatriate sportspeople in Bolivia
Expatriate footballers in Bolivia
Argentine football managers
Real Santa Cruz managers
Argentine expatriate football managers
Expatriate football managers in Bolivia